A.E. Istiaia F.C. is a Greek football club, based in Istiaia, Euboea.

The club was founded in 1928.

Honours

Domestic
 Eps Euboea Champions: 1
 2015-16

Current squad
2019–20 season

References

Association football clubs established in 1930
1930 establishments in Greece
Euboea (regional unit)
Gamma Ethniki clubs